The 1978 Commonwealth Games were held in Edmonton, Alberta from 3 to 12 August 1978, two years after the 1976 Summer Olympics were held in Montreal, Quebec. They were boycotted by Nigeria, in protest at New Zealand's sporting contacts with apartheid-era South Africa, as well as by Uganda, in protest at alleged Canadian hostility towards the government of Idi Amin. The Bid Election was held at the 1972 Summer Olympics in Munich.

This was the first Commonwealth Games where a computerised system was used to handle ticket sales.

These were the first Commonwealth Games to be named Commonwealth Games, having dropped British.

The Games were opened by Queen Elizabeth II for the first time since becoming Queen in 1952.

Host selection

Participating teams

46 teams were represented at the 1978 Games.(Teams competing for the first time are shown in bold).

Medals by country

Medals by event

Athletics

Badminton

Bowls

Boxing

Cycling
Track

Road

Diving

Gymnastics

Shooting
Pistol

Rifle

Shotgun

Swimming
Men's events

Women's events

Weightlifting

Wrestling

Venues
 Commonwealth Stadium: Athletics, Opening and Closing Ceremonies (built new for the games)
 University of Alberta Arena: Badminton
 Commonwealth Bowls: Lawn Bowling (built new for the games)
 Edmonton Gardens: Boxing
 Argyll Velodrome: Cycling (built new for the games)
 Northlands Coliseum: Gymnastics
 Strathcona Shooting Range: Shooting (built new for the games)
 Kinsmen Aquatic Centre: Swimming and Diving (built new for the games)
 Jubilee Auditorium: Weightlifting
 University of Alberta Gym: Wrestling

References

External links
 Commonwealth Games Official Site
 A Brief History from the Delhi 2010 site
 1978 Commonwealth Games – Australian Commonwealth Games official website
 Going the Distance, an NFB documentary

 
Sports competitions in Edmonton
International sports competitions hosted by Canada
Commonwealth Games
Commonwealth Games in Canada
Commonwealth Games by year
Commonwealth Games
Commonwealth
August 1978 sports events in Canada
1970s in Edmonton